Coleophora micronotella is a moth of the family Coleophoridae. It is found in Tunisia, Spain, Sardinia, Italy and Sicily. It has also been recorded from Kazakhstan and Tajikistan. A record from Iran is based on a misidentification.

The larvae feed on Halocnemum strobilaceum and Halostachys caspica. They feed on the assimilation shoots of their host plant. They feed as a borer, without making a case.

References

micronotella
Moths described in 1956
Moths of Asia
Moths of Africa
Moths of Europe